"Quand je ferme les yeux" (English: "When I Close My Eyes") is an electronic music song performed by Belgian singer Natacha Atlas and Myra Boyle. It was written by Atlas, Brian Higgins and myra boyle, Lisa Cowling, and produced by Xenomania for Atlas' fifth album Something Dangerous (2003). It was released as a single by Mantra Recordings in 2003.

Formats and track listings
These are the formats and track listings of major single releases of "Quand je ferme les yeux".
 
CD single
(Released 2003; ATLAS #16)
 "Quand je ferme les yeux" (Single edit) – 3:21
 "When I Close My Eyes" (Album version) – 4:31

Personnel
The following people contributed to "Quand je ferme les yeux":

Natacha Atlas, Myra Boyle – vocals
Xenomania – production

References

External links
Official website

2003 singles
French-language songs
Electronic songs
Natacha Atlas songs
World music songs
Songs written by Brian Higgins (producer)
Songs written by Lisa Cowling
2003 songs
Song recordings produced by Xenomania
Songs written by Natacha Atlas